Giuseppe G. Ruisi (November 20, 1907January 27, 1975) was an Italian Supreme Court Judge.

Career
Ruisi first studied in Sicily at the College of Christ Jesuits (at Mussomeli). His studies were paid for by an unknown benefactor. He later graduated with a degree in philosophy at the University of Palermo and then began his career as a teacher, starting in Malta and then moving to Sant'Agata di Militello (Messina). Ruisi then re-enrolled at the University of Palermo and graduated with a degree in Law. In 1940, during World War II, he volunteered for military service, but Italy needed Judges and he was therefore turned down. Later Ruisi was a Magistrate in the Court of Bologna, and then promoted to Judge of the Supreme Court of Cassation (Corte di Cassazione) . He was President of the Chamber of the Court of Appeals. He went on to write about the law in his series Il Fallimento.

Works
Ruisi published 3 volumes on the System of Civil & Commercial Jurisprudence called Il Fallimento.

References 

20th-century Italian judges
1907 births
1975 deaths
Jurists from Bologna